Michael Vicens (born 21 January 1956) is a Puerto Rican basketball player. He competed in the men's tournament at the 1976 Summer Olympics.

References

External links
 

1956 births
Living people
Puerto Rican men's basketball players
1974 FIBA World Championship players
Olympic basketball players of Puerto Rico
Basketball players at the 1976 Summer Olympics
Place of birth missing (living people)